The Gay and Lesbian Times was a lesbian, gay, bisexual and transgender (LGBT) newspaper in the San Diego, California area. The Times was a member of the National Gay Newspaper Guild. The paper originally launched in January 1988 as the San Diego Gay Times.

In May 2010, it was accused of defrauding advertisers over circulation counts while being saddled in debt. In September 2010 it folded.

In December 2010, its founder Michael Portantino committed suicide by jumping from the Park Manor Suites, a historic 7-story San Diego hotel popular with the gay community.

Another major newspaper, the San Diego Gay and Lesbian News, launched in 2009 and continues to the present.

References

Weekly newspapers published in California
LGBT culture in San Diego
LGBT-related newspapers published in the United States
Newspapers published in San Diego
Publications established in 1988
Publications disestablished in 2010
1980s LGBT literature